National Route 413 is a national highway of Japan connecting Fujiyoshida, Yamanashi and Sagamihara, Kanagawa in Japan, with a total length of 71.7 km (44.55 mi).

The road goes through Dōshi, and for some of its length is also known as Dōshi-michi (i.e. the Dōshi road).

References

National highways in Japan
Roads in Kanagawa Prefecture
Roads in Yamanashi Prefecture